Termitonannini is a tribe of rove beetles in the subfamily Aleocharinae.

References

External links 
 
 Termitonannini at insectoid.info

Aleocharinae
Polyphaga tribes